Ayakum Lake is a lake near the northern boundary of the Tibetan Plateau, to the southeast of the Kunlun Mountains. While many of the small glacier and snowmelt-fed streams on the Plateau give rise to major South-east Asian rivers (including the Mekong and Yangtze), some empty into saline lakes such as Lake Ayakum.

References

Lakes of Xinjiang